The Bovey Formation is a deposit of sands, clays and lignite, probably over 1000 feet thick. It lies in a sedimentary basin termed the Bovey Basin which extends from Bovey Tracey to Newton Abbot in South Devon, England. The Bovey Basin lies along the line of the Sticklepath fault and owes its existence to subsidence along this fault.

The deposit is the result of the degradation of the neighbouring Dartmoor granite; it was laid down in river flood plains and lakes during the late Eocene and Oligocene periods. Most of the fossilised plant material in the lignite is from Sequoia couttsiae.

The Bovey Formation is the major source in England for ball clay – a highly plastic fine-grained kaolinitic sedimentary clay typically used by the pottery industry. Large excavations have been made for the extraction of these clays. In the past, the lignite or "Bovey Coal" was burned in local kilns; steam engines; and workmen's cottages. It was, however, not economical.

References

Lithostratigraphy of England
Oligocene
Geology of Devon